This is a list of consorts of the Savoyard monarchs.

Countess of Savoy, 1003–1416

Duchess of Savoy, 1416–1713 

As courtesy title

Queen of Sardinia, 1720–1861 

Between 1859 and 1861 the Kingdom of Sardinia incorporated the majority of Italian states. On 17 March 1861 King Victor Emmanuel II was proclaimed King of Italy by the Parliament in Turin.

Queen of Italy, 1861–1946

Duchess of Savoy, post 1946 (monarchy abolished)

Notes

Sources
SAVOY

 
 
 House of Savoy
Savoyard, consorts
Savoyard, consorts
Savoyard, consorts
Savoyard, consorts